Agioi Pantes ("All Saints"), is a Greek islet, north of the coast of Lasithi, eastern Crete, close to Agios Nikolaos. In antiquity, it was named Pyrrha or Pyrra.

References

See also
List of islands of Greece

Uninhabited islands of Crete
Mediterranean islands
Landforms of Lasithi
Islands of Greece